The Albești is a left tributary of the river Cungrișoara in Romania. It flows into the Cungrișoara in Miești.

References

Rivers of Romania
Rivers of Olt County